Os Amadores is a Brazilian television series created by Mauro Wilson.

Plot 
Os Amadores is a dramatic comedy, in which four men in their 40s, who have never seen each other before, have a clinical death declared in the ICU of a hospital, where they have stopped for different reasons. They are able to return to life, and start a friendship. Guided by the attempt to make their second lives a happier experience, the four friends decide to unite and help each other in solving their problems.

Cast 
Murilo Benício ... Guilherme Ferreira
Matheus Nachtergaele ... Jaime
Otávio Müller ... Tadeu
Cássio Gabus Mendes ... Marquinhos

Awards 
Os Amadores was twice nominated to International Emmy Awards.

References

External links
 Official website
 Os Amadores at the IMDb

2005 Brazilian television series debuts
2007 Brazilian television series endings
Portuguese-language television shows
Brazilian television specials
Rede Globo original programming